was a Japanese composer, mandolinist, and guitarist of the Shōwa era who was dubbed "Japan's Irving Berlin" by Universal Press Syndicate. He was awarded the Order of the Sacred Treasure (Fourth Class) and the People's Honor Award for his contributions to Japanese music.

Life 
Koga was born in 1904 in the village of Taguchi (today part of the city Ōkawa) in the Mizuma District of Fukuoka Prefecture; he was the sixth of eight children. In 1910, Koga's father, Kitarō, died. As a result, Koga, his mother, older sister, and younger brother moved to Korea in 1912, where his eldest brother had migrated for work. His family first traveled to Incheon, before settling in Keijo (today part of Seoul). During this period, Koga was gifted a taishōgoto from his cousin; then later, while enrolled at the Keijō Good Neighbor Trade School, a mandolin from an older brother living in Osaka. 

He was regarded as a notable figure for establishing the genre enka, though Koga considered that he was a ryūkōka composer. He wrote numerous songs for Ichiro Fujiyama and Hibari Misora. Koga’s songs have been heard by Western audiences in various films, including Come See the Paradise, and Memoirs of a Geisha. He was the first president of the Japan Composer's Association from 1958 to 1978.

References 

1904 births
1978 deaths
20th-century classical musicians
20th-century guitarists
20th-century Japanese composers
20th-century Japanese male musicians
Japanese classical guitarists
Japanese male composers
Musicians from Fukuoka Prefecture
Nippon Columbia artists
People from Ōkawa, Fukuoka
People's Honour Award winners
Teichiku Records artists
Recipients of the Order of the Sacred Treasure, 4th class
Presidents of the Japan Composer's Association